Fiore v. White may refer to:

United States Supreme Court opinions
Fiore v. White, 528 U.S. 23 (1999)
Fiore v. White, 531 U.S. 225 (2001)